Mintonsville is an unincorporated community in Gates County, North Carolina, United States.

References

Unincorporated communities in Gates County, North Carolina
Unincorporated communities in North Carolina